Sherry Beth Ortner (born September 19, 1941) is an American cultural anthropologist and has been a Distinguished Professor of Anthropology at UCLA since 2004.

Biography
Ortner grew up in a Jewish family in Newark, New Jersey, and attended Weequahic High School, as did Philip Roth and Richie Roberts. She received her B.A. from Bryn Mawr College in 1962. She then studied anthropology at the University of Chicago with Clifford Geertz and obtained her Ph.D. in anthropology in 1970 for her fieldwork among the Sherpas in Nepal.  She has taught at Sarah Lawrence College, the University of Michigan, the University of California, Berkeley, Columbia University, and the University of California, Los Angeles. She has done extensive fieldwork with the Sherpas of Nepal, on religion, politics, and the Sherpas' involvement in Himalayan mountaineering.  Her final book on the Sherpas, Life and Death on Mt. Everest, was awarded the J.I. Staley Prize for the best anthropology book of 2004.

In the very early 1990s, Ortner changed the focus of her research to the United States.  Her first project was on the meanings and working of "class" in the United States, using her own high school graduating class as her ethnographic subjects.  Her most recent book concerns the relationship between Hollywood films and American culture.  She also publishes regularly in the areas of cultural theory and feminist theory.

Sherry Ortner was awarded a MacArthur "Genius" grant in 1990. In 1992, she was elected a Fellow of the American Academy of Arts and Sciences. She has been awarded the Retzius Medal of the Swedish Society for Anthropology and Geography.

Ortner was previously married to Robert Paul, a cultural anthropologist now at Emory University; and to Raymond C. Kelly, Emeritus Professor of Anthropology at The University of Michigan. She is currently married to Timothy D. Taylor, a Professor of Ethnomusicology and Musicology at UCLA.

Theoretical foundations
Ortner is a well-known proponent of practice theory. She does not focus on societal reproduction but centers on the idea of "serious games", on resistance and transformation within a society. She formed her ideas while working with Sherpas.  She is concerned with the dominant constraints of cultural understanding within cultures, subversive to the idea of culture as being simply reproduced. Actors play with skill in a game of life with power and inequality.  Seeing social structure as a kind of sporting arena, playing a game of life in the field, and that the rules are set by the society's structure. But one is a free agent, one does not have to follow the rules. One can break the rules of life. This results in one being carried away or results in changing the rules and boundaries by this action. Ortner focuses on the issues of resistance and transformation.

Selected publications

(1974) "Is female to male as nature is to culture?" pp. 67–87 in Woman, Culture, and Society, edited by M. Z. Rosaldo and L. Lamphere. Stanford, CA: Stanford University Press.
(1978) Sherpas through their Rituals. Cambridge: Cambridge University Press. 
(1981) Sexual Meanings: The Cultural Construction of Gender and Sexuality (co-edited with Harriet Whitehead). Cambridge: Cambridge University Press. 
(1984) "Theory in Anthropology Since the Sixties." Comparative Studies in Society and History 26(1):126-166.
(1989) High Religion: A Cultural and Political History of Sherpa Buddhism. Princeton, NJ: Princeton University Press.
(1995) Resistance and the Problem of Ethnographic Refusal. Comparative Studies in Society and History 37(1):173-193
(1996) Making Gender: The Politics and Erotics of Culture. Boston: Beacon Press. 
(1999) Life and Death on Mount Everest: Sherpas and Himalayan Mountaineering. Princeton, NJ: Princeton University Press.
(1999) (ed.) The Fate of "Culture": Geertz and Beyond. Berkeley, CA: University of California Press. 
(2003) New Jersey Dreaming: Capital, Culture, and the Class of '58. Durham, NC: Duke University Press
(2006) Anthropology and Social Theory: Culture, Power, and the Acting Subject. Durham, NC: Duke University Press.
(2013) Not Hollywood: Independent Film at the Twilight of the American Dream. Durham, NC: Duke University Press.

References

External links
Sherry Ortner UCLA faculty profile
The Long Way Home article in University of Chicago Magazine, Feb 1996.
Review of Ortner's book "Making Gender: The Politics and Erotics of Culture"
Interview with Sherry Ortner in AIBR Journal

1941 births
American anthropologists
Anthropologists of religion
Bryn Mawr College alumni
Fellows of the American Academy of Arts and Sciences
Living people
University of Chicago alumni
MacArthur Fellows
People from Newark, New Jersey
Weequahic High School alumni
American women anthropologists
Jewish American academics
University of Michigan faculty
Jewish anthropologists
American women academics
21st-century American Jews
21st-century American women
Columbia University faculty
University of California, Los Angeles faculty